Diyalog (Turkish for "dialogue") is a daily newspaper published in Northern Cyprus. Its first issue was published on 4 December 2013. Its editor in chief is Reşat Akar, who also owns 20% of the newspaper; the remaining 80% is owned by Net Holding. For the first months of its publishing, it gained a foothold on the market using promotional campaigns such as the delivery of lottery tickets as gifts. It is institutionally related to Diyalog TV.

See also
 List of newspapers in Northern Cyprus

References

Newspapers published in Northern Cyprus
Newspapers established in 2013
Turkish-language newspapers